Primula lutea is a species of primrose that grows on basic rocks in the mountain ranges of southeastern Europe, including the southern and eastern Alps, southern Carpathians, Apennines, and the Balkans. The leaves are obovate and stalkless, with a cartilaginous edge, all growing in a basal rosette. The yellow flowers grow in clusters on 5–20 cm long stalks.

In the past it was considered synonymous with the very similar Primula auricula, but a recent study split this species off from P. auricula, with the latter being found in the more northerly areas (western Alps, Jura, Vosges, Black Forest and Tatra mountains).

References

 Zhang, L-B., & J. W. Kadereit (2004): Classification of Primula sect. Auricula (Primulaceae) based on two molecular data sets (ITS, AFLPs), morphology and geographical distribution. Botanical Journal of the Linnean Society 146: 1–26.
 Zhang, L-B. & J. W. Kadereit (2005): Typification and synonymization in Primula sect. Auricula (Primulaceae). Taxon 54 (3): 775–788.

lutea
Alpine flora